Monazite-(Sm) is an exceedingly rare representative of the monazite group, with samarium being the dominant rare earth element in its structure. It is the samarium analogue of monazite-(Ce), monazite-(La), and monazite-(Nd). It is only the second known mineral with samarium being the mineral-forming element, after florencite-(Sm). The group contains simple rare earth phosphate minerals with the general formula of ATO4, where A = Ce, La, Nd, or Sm (or, rarely, Bi), and B = P or, rarely, As. The A site may also bear Ca and Th.

References

Samarium minerals
Phosphate minerals
Monoclinic minerals
Minerals in space group 11
Minerals described in 2002